A Pazo is a type of Galician traditional house.  Similar to a manor house, pazos are usually located in the countryside, as former residences of important people in the community (formerly of kings and nobility). They were of crucial importance in the 17th to 19th centuries, related to rural and monastic architecture and the system of feudal organization, and they constituted a type of local management unit around which the life of the villagers revolved. Over time they become the social symbol and refuge of the noble class, which Otero Pedrayo portrayed in his novels in early 20th century.

The pazo, as a traditional civil architectural structure, had associated a social network: the servants of the nobleman and the tributaries of the domain, who themselves came to live on the grounds of the pazo (mostly the former). A pazo usually consists of a main building surrounded by gardens, a dovecote and often include outbuildings such as small chapels for religious celebrations. An example being the pazo de Cadro in Marin, the seat of the House of Romay, which had a chapel dedicated to Santa Barbara. 

The word pazo is a cognate of stately palace, and comes from the Latin palatiu(m). As a curiosity, the Portuguese word, close to the Galician language, to say palace is paço (instead of palácio). In this regard, the Paço Imperial in Rio de Janeiro, built in the 18th century, is an example of the Portuguese counterpart of this type of building.

Gallery

See also 
 Galicia

Galician culture
Housing in Spain
Manor houses in Spain
Buildings and structures in Galicia (Spain)
Vernacular architecture